Steven R. Swayne is a professor of music and currently music department chair at Dartmouth College. He has authored a study of the music of American musical theater composer Stephen Sondheim and a biography of American composer and educator William Schuman. Swayne is a native of Los Angeles, California and is a graduate of John Muir High School and Occidental College. He has graduate degrees from Fuller Theological Seminary (M.Div.) and the University of California, Berkeley (MA, Ph.D.).  He has taught at UC Berkeley and at the San Francisco Conservatory of Music, and he has worked as a pianist at Nordstrom. He also plays the piano in concerts and has performed with the San Francisco Symphony under the direction of Michael Tilson Thomas.  He has a Christmas CD called "Holiday Twists" and a CD of the preludes of Frédéric Chopin, Gabriel Fauré, and George Gershwin.

In 2019, he was elected president of the American Musicological Society. In March 2022, he joined the John W. Kluge Center at the Library of Congress as Chair in Modern Culture.

Works
How Sondheim Found His Sound, University of Michigan Press (2005; paperback, 2007), 
Orpheus in Manhattan: William Schuman and the Shaping of America's Musical Life, Oxford University Press, USA (2011),

References

External links

Dartmouth College entry
LOC entry

Dartmouth College faculty
Musicians from Los Angeles
Living people
American music historians
American male non-fiction writers
Writers from Los Angeles
American male pianists
21st-century American pianists
21st-century American male musicians
Year of birth missing (living people)
Historians from California